Burkholderia pseudomultivorans is a bacterium from the genus Burkholderia and the family Burkholderiaceae which was isolated from samples of the human respiratory tract. Burkholderia pseudomultivorans belongs to the Burkholderia cepacia complex.

References

External links
Type strain of Burkholderia pseudomultivorans at BacDive -  the Bacterial Diversity Metadatabase

Burkholderiaceae
Bacteria described in 2014